Southgate or South Gate may refer to:

Places

Australia
Southgate, Sylvania
Southgate Arts and Leisure Precinct, an area within Southbank, Victoria

Canada
Southgate, Ontario, a township in Grey County
Southgate, Middlesex County, Ontario

Edmonton
Southgate Centre, a shopping centre in Edmonton, Alberta
Southgate station (Edmonton), a light rail station in Edmonton, Alberta

New Zealand
 Southgate, New Zealand, a suburb of Wellington

South Africa
 Southgate, South Africa

South Korea
 Namdaemun, Seoul

United Kingdom
Southgate, London, a suburban area of north London
Enfield Southgate (UK Parliament constituency)
Southgate tube station, a London Underground station
Municipal Borough of Southgate, historic local government district
New Southgate, a residential suburb in London, England
SouthGate, Bath, a shopping centre in Bath, Somerset, England
, village in Ceredigion, Wales
Southgate, Cheshire
Southgate, Norfolk
Southgate Estate, Runcorn, a housing development, demolished in 1990
Southgate, Swansea
Southgate, West Sussex, a neighbourhood in Crawley, West Sussex, England

United States
South Gate, California
Southgate, Florida
South Gate, Indiana
Southgate, Kentucky
South Gate, Maryland
Southgate, Michigan
Southgate Shopping Center, Southgate, Michigan
Southgate, Houston, Texas, a neighborhood
Westfield Southgate, formerly Southgate Plaza, in Sarasota, Florida
 Southgate, U.S. Virgin Islands

People
Southgate (surname)

Other uses
, a British ship
Southgate (album), a 1998 album by Seventh Avenue
Southgate Shopping Centre
Southgate Shopping Center

See also 
Southgate Mall (disambiguation)
Southgate River, a river in British Columbia, Canada